"Excuse Me" is a song by American singer Jazmine Sullivan. It was written by Sullivan, Cainon Lamb, and Missy Elliott for her second studio album, Love Me Back (2010), while production helmed by the latter, with Lamb credited as co-producer. The song contains a sample from "Take It or Leave It" by American R&B vocal group The Manhattans.  Due to the inclusion of the sample, Ben Weisman and Richard Germinaro are credited as songwriters. "Excuse Me" was released by J Records in 2011 as the album's third single and reached number 71 on the US Hot R&B/Hip-Hop Songs.

Credits and personnel 
Credits adapted from the album's liner notes.

Missy Elliott – producer, writer
Paul J. Falcone – engineer
Cainon Lamb – co-producer, drum programming, writer
Jazmine Sullivan – vocals, writer

Charts

References

2011 singles
Jazmine Sullivan songs
Songs written by Jazmine Sullivan
Songs written by Missy Elliott
Song recordings produced by Salaam Remi
Music videos directed by Benny Boom
2010 songs
J Records singles
Songs with music by Ben Weisman
Songs written by Cainon Lamb